Gigi Fernández and Jana Novotná were the defending champions, but none competed this year.

Larisa Savchenko and Natasha Zvereva won the title by defeating Gretchen Magers and Robin White 6–1, 2–6, 6–2 in the final.

Seeds
The first four seeds received a bye to the second round.

Draw

Finals

Top half

Bottom half

References

External links
 Official results archive (ITF)
 Official results archive (WTA)

1991 WTA Tour
LA Women's Tennis Championships